Elasmodactylus tetensis, commonly known as the Tete thick-toed gecko or Zambezi thick-toed gecko, is a species of gecko endemic to East Africa.

Description
E. tetensis, unlike any other species in the genus Elasmodactylus, is very large, and males have 8-14 preanal pores.

Geographic range & habitat
E. tetensis is found in Mopane bushveld in the Zambezi river valley from Lake Kariba to Tete. There is a disjunct population in southern Tanzania.

Behaviour
E. tetensis is a highly gregarious species and often roosts side by side with numerous other individuals during the day in rock cracks or hollow tree trunks like hollow baobab trees.

They are nocturnal insectivores but may forage within a short distance of their roost during daylight. Once it is dark, they extend the territory they patrol in search of arthropods.

Reproduction
Sexually mature females lay two eggs at a time but can produce several clutches a season depending on food supply.

Subspecies
There is an isolated population in southern Tanzania in similar habitat that is very likely a subspecies or another species forming a complex with tetensis.

References

Further reading
Branch, Bill. 2004. Field Guide to Snakes and other Reptiles of Southern Africa. Sanibel Island, Florida: Ralph Curtis Books. 399 pp. . (Pachydactylus tetensis, p. 261).
Loveridge A. 1953. "Zoological Results of a Fifth Expedition to East Africa. III. Reptiles from Nyasaland and Tete". Bull. Mus. Comp. Zool. Harvard 110 (3): 142–322. (Pachydactylus tetensis, new species, pp. 175–176 + Plate 5, figure 3).
Spawls, Stephen; Howell, Kim; Drewes, Robert C. 2006. Reptiles and Amphibians of East Africa. Princeton Pocket Guides. Princeton, New Jersey: Princeton University Press. 240 pp. .

Reptiles of Tanzania
Reptiles of Mozambique
Reptiles of Zimbabwe
tetensis
Taxa named by Arthur Loveridge
Reptiles described in 1953